Joseph Rutherford Dundas (January 20, 1836 – January 24, 1896) was an Irish-born merchant and political figure in Ontario, Canada. He represented Victoria South in the House of Commons of Canada from 1882 to 1887 as a Conservative member.

He was born in Drum, County Monaghan, the son of John Dundas, and came to Canada in 1848, settling in Peterborough. In 1856, Rutherford moved to Lindsay working in William Cluxton's dry goods store at the northeast corner of William and Kent Streets. In 1860, having been promoted to partner by William Cluxton, the business changed its name to Cluxton & Dundas. The dry goods store would operate under this name until 1870 when Cluxton sold his interest to Dundas. He married Caroline Jones in 1864. Rutherford was involved in the grain trade and also served as a director of the Midland Railway.

References 
 
The Canadian parliamentary companion, 1885 JA Gemmill

1836 births
1896 deaths
Members of the House of Commons of Canada from Ontario
Conservative Party of Canada (1867–1942) MPs